The 2014 IFAGG World Cup series in Aesthetic Group Gymnastics is a series of competitions officially organized and promoted by the International Federation of Aesthetic Group Gymnastics.

Formats

Medal winners

World Cup

Challenge Cup

Overall medal table

References

External links
Official Site
Results 

Aesthetic Group Gymnastics World Cup
2014 in gymnastics